Vladimir Dedijer (4 February 1914 – 30 November 1990) was a Yugoslav partisan fighter during World War II who became known as a politician, human rights activist, and historian. In the early postwar years, he represented Yugoslavia at the United Nations and was a senior government official.

Later, after being at cross purposes with the government, he concentrated on his academic career as a historian. He taught at the University of Belgrade and also served as a visiting professor at several universities in the United States and Europe. He participated in the Bertrand Russell International War Crimes Tribunal in 1967, reviewing United States forces activities in Vietnam, and in later tribunals.

Origins and family
Vladimir Dedijer was born to a Serbian family in Belgrade, in the Kingdom of Serbia, which later was absorbed into Yugoslavia. His family originated from Čepelica, Bileća in Bosnia and Herzegovina and were Orthodox Christians. His father, Jevto Dedijer, was a professor of geography at Belgrade University and his mother, Milica, was a social worker. He was the middle of three sons: Borivoje, Vladimir, and Stevan.

Before World War II, Dedijer married Olga 
Popović. Their daughter, Milica, was named for his mother. After Olga died in 1943, her widower married again the next year to Vera Krizman, an actress. He and Vera had four children together: daughter Bojana and three sons, Borivoje (Boro), Branimir (Branko), and Marko Dedijer. Branko committed suicide at 13, after being interrogated by police about his father's political activities. After he returned home, he hanged himself. Boro committed suicide in 1966 by jumping off a cliff near his father's house. But Dedijer believed that Boro was killed by Slovenian police.

Political and revolutionary activity
In his youth Dedijer attended the Conference for Reconciliation in Poland in 1929 as a delegate of Yugoslav high school youth. In 1931, he attended the XX World Congress of the Young Men's Christian Association in Cleveland, Ohio in the United States.

After finishing high school, Dedijer worked for the daily newspaper Politika while studying law. As a journalist, he became a foreign correspondent in Poland, Denmark, Norway (1935), England (1935-1936), and Spain (1936) in the years before the outbreak of World War II. For his support of the Republican government in Spain during the Spanish Civil War, Dedijer was fired from Politika in 1937 by order of the Yugoslav government.

During the 1930s, Dedijer collaborated with the Communist Party of Yugoslavia (CPY). Dedijer considered himself an independent thinker like Serbian ancestors. "It is hard to be a Serb," he said once, "But how beautiful!"

Dedijer joined Yugoslav partisans in 1941 in their struggle against the Nazi Germany occupiers. He served as Lieutenant Colonel in Tito's headquarters. During the war he was a political commissar.

His wife, Olga, a medical student who had become a partisan surgeon, was killed during the battle of Sutjeska in Bosnia in 1943. He was wounded then and on two later occasions. The day after Olga's funeral, Dedijer was seriously injured. Tito partisans promoted him to colonel and sent him to recover in Cairo, Egypt and Naples, Italy. In 1944 Dedijer returned to Tito's Adriatic base Vis.

After the war Dedijer served as a member of the Yugoslav delegation on 1946 Paris peace conference and in several sessions of United Nations General Assembly (1945–1952). He also became a history professor at the University of Belgrade.

In 1952 Dedijer became a member of the Party's Central Committee. The following year he was appointed to the Federal Assembly. He was the sole member of the Central Committee to side in 1954 with Milovan Djilas when Djilas was deposed by Tito for criticizing a "New Class" of party bureaucrats and advocating the rule of law in socialism.  Dedijer defended Djilas's right to freedom of expression before the Central Committee of the CPY in January 1954. In response, Dedijer was expelled from the CPY, removed from his political offices, and dismissed from his teaching position in the History Department at the University of Belgrade. Djilas was jailed and Dedijer received a suspended prison sentence of six months.

University career

Granted a passport by Yugoslav authorities in 1959, Dedijer was allowed to leave the country with his family. From then on, he devoted himself to writing history and teaching. He taught at University of Belgrade and served as visiting professor of history at universities in the United States: Michigan, Harvard, Stanford, Princeton, and Yale; and in Europe: Paris (Sorbonne), Manchester (England), and Stockholm, Sweden.

In 1978 he was admitted as a full member to the Serbian Academy of Sciences and Arts.

Dedijer is known for his book, The Yugoslav Auschwitz and the Vatican: The Croatian Massacre of the Serbs During World War II, which was translated into several languages. He wrote about the violent repression and genocide committed by Ustashe Catholics in Croatia against ethnicities and religions that they considered heretics. He estimated a total of 750,000 Orthodox Serbs; 60,000 Jews; and 26,000 Sinti and Roma were massacred by the Ustashe.

The preface of the 1992 book edition reads, 
»...in Catholic Croatia, the 'Kingdom of God', everyone who did not belong to the Catholic faith - for the most part Orthodox Serbs - was compelled to convert to Catholicism. Those who refused - as well as many who had already converted - were murdered, usually after prolonged torture in which the order of the day was the cutting off of noses, ears, or other body parts, or poking out eyes. Children were cut out of the bodies of pregnant women and subsequently beheaded; people were chopped to pieces before the eyes of loved ones, who were even forced to catch the spurting blood in a bowl, etc., to list only a few horrors as examples. These atrocities assumed such an extent that even German Nazis, who were not exactly sensitive in such matters, protested. If this historical fact is little known where we are, another fact completely escapes our knowledge: the decisive involvement of the Vatican in these massacres.«

His history, The Road to Sarajevo (1966), discusses the origins of World War I. His book Tito (1953), was translated into twenty languages. Dedijer donated all his income from that book ($530,000) to charities. Dedijer wrote two important accounts of Yugoslav Partisan history: Diary and Tito, both of which have been published in English.

Human rights activity, later life and death
Dedijer was considered a leading authority on genocide in the twentieth century. Together with French philosopher and activist Jean-Paul Sartre, he chaired the Bertrand Russell International Tribune on War Crimes, organized in 1966, in the role of the first vice-president.

The First International Russell Tribunal was set up in 1966 to adjudicate the war crimes committed by the US in Vietnam and conducted hearings in 1967. The Tribunal was due to sit in Paris, but the French authorities refused to grant an entry visa to Dedijer. For that reason, the Tribunal held its first session in Stockholm, Sweden (2-10 May 1967) and the second session in Roskilde, Denmark (20 November-1 December 1967). Both sessions were presided by Dedijer. The sessions condemned the US for war crimes, aggression, and genocide in the Vietnam War.

Dedijer presided over the Third International Russell Tribunal, which was constituted in Darmstadt and  held on 16 October 1977. The Tribunal dealt with the denial of the right of individuals to practice their chosen profession in West Germany because of their political convictions, after the government had issued a discriminatory decree against radicals at a time of great social unrest in the nation. legislature had passed laws against in West Germany.

In 1982, Dedijer filed a lawsuit against Kosta Nađ and Ivica Račan.

Dedijer died in Boston, Massachusetts on 30 November 1990. He was subsequently cremated. His ashes were returned for interment at Žale Central Cemetery in Ljubljana, Slovenia.

Dedijer's bibliography
, Borba, Ljubljana, 1949 (in Slovenian) 
Tito speaks: his self-portrait and struggle with Stalin, London : Weidenfeld and Nicolson, 1953.
On military conventions; an essay on the evolution of international law, Lund, Gleerup 1961
The Beloved Land, MacGibbon & Kee, 1961
Tito, Simon and Schuster, 1963
The Road to Sarajevo, Simon and Schuster, 1966 - World War, 1914-1918 
History of Yugoslavia, McGraw-Hill Book Co., 1974
The Battle Stalin Lost: Memoirs of Yugoslavia 1948-1953, Spokesman Books, Jan 1, 1978
(Serbian) , Mladost, Zagreb 1980 
(Serbian) , Prosveta, Beograd 1980
(Serbian) , Rad Beograd 1987
(Serbian) , Rad Beograd 1987
(Bosnian) , Svjetlost, Sarajevo 1990
The War Diaries of Vladimir Dedijer, Volume 1: From April 6, 1941, to November 27, 1942, University of Michigan Press, Ann Arbor, 1990
The War Diaries of Vladimir Dedijer, Volume 2: From November 28, 1942, to September 10, 1943, University of Michigan Press, Ann Arbor, May 1, 1990
The War Diaries of Vladimir Dedijer, Volume 3:From September 11, 1943, to November 7, 1944, University of Michigan Press, Ann Arbor, Sep 1, 1990
The Yugoslav Auschwitz and the Vatican: the Croatian Massacre of the Serbs during World War II, Buffalo, N.Y. : Prometheus Books ; Freiburg, Germany : Ahriman-Verlag, 1992.

References

External links

 
 Serbian Academy of Sciences and Arts biography 

1914 births
1990 deaths
Writers from Belgrade
People from Bileća
People from the Kingdom of Serbia
League of Communists of Serbia politicians
Central Committee of the League of Communists of Yugoslavia members
Maleševci
Vladimir
20th-century journalists
Yugoslav Partisans members
Yugoslav journalists
Serbian people of World War II
Serbian journalists
Serbian biographers
Academic staff of the University of Belgrade
Members of the Serbian Academy of Sciences and Arts
Burials at Žale